Ann Ewing and variants may refer to:

 Ann Ewing (Dallas), fictional character in the 2012 TV series Dallas
 Anna Ewing (died 2004), victim of Terry Blair (serial killer)
 Annabelle Ewing (born 1960), Scottish politician and lawyer
 Anne Ewing (1930–2011), American activist
 Margaret Anne Ewing (1945–2006), Scottish SNP MP and SNP MSP
 Ann E. Ewing, science journalist credited with first use of the term "black hole" in 1964